VIBGYOR (Violet–Indigo–Blue–Green–Yellow–Orange–Red) is a popular mnemonic device used for memorizing the traditional optical spectrum.

VIBGYOR may refer to:

 ROYGBIV, the exact reverse of VIBGYOR; the sequence of hues commonly ascribed to rainbows
 ViBGYOR Film Festival
 VIBGYOR Group of Schools